Cheilymenia is a genus of fungi in the family Pyronemataceae. The genus has a widespread distribution, especially in  temperate regions, and contains 66 species, many very similar in appearance and habitat and only separable by microscopic features.

Species
Species include:
Cheilymenia fimicola
Cheilymenia granulata
Cheilymenia stercorea

References

Pyronemataceae
Pezizales genera
Taxa named by Jean Louis Émile Boudier
Taxa described in 1885